Camaragibe River is a river in Alagoas state in eastern Brazil. It flows into the Atlantic Ocean in Passo de Camaragibe municipality.

See also
List of rivers of Alagoas

References
Brazilian Ministry of Transport

Rivers of Alagoas